Biberach an der Riß (Swabian: Bibra), often referred to as simply Biberach, is a town in southern Germany. It is the capital of Biberach district, in the Upper Swabia region of the German state (Land) of Baden-Württemberg. It is called Biberach an der Riß after the small river Riß which flows through the city to distinguish it from the other towns of similar names.

Geography 
Biberach has a population of about 32,000 and is located in Upper Swabia between the river Danube and Lake Constance.

Populated places 
The districts of Biberach comprise the inner city (with the quarters Bachlangen, Bergerhausen, Birkendorf, Burren, Fünf Linden, Gaisental, Hagenbuch, Jordanbad, Mumpfental, Reichenbach and Wolfentalmühle) and its suburban, integrated villages Rißegg, Rindenmoos, Ringschnait, Stafflangen and Mettenberg.

History

For many centuries, Biberach was an Imperial Free City in the Holy Roman Empire. In that role it participated in the 1792 Reichstag.

During the Protestant Reformation, Biberach was notable for being — eventually along only with Ravensburg, Augsburg and Dinkelsbühl — a "Mixed Imperial City" where the Peace of Westphalia caused the establishment of a joint Catholic–Protestant government and administrative system, with equality offices and a precise and equal distribution between Catholic and Protestant civic officials. This status ended in 1803, when Biberach was annexed by the Margraviate of Baden, soon to become a grand-duchy. In 1806, it was traded to the Kingdom of Württemberg in exchange for the town of Villingen; becoming part of the German Empire on its creation in 1871.

During the French Revolutionary Wars, Biberach and its environs were the site of two sizable battles in 1796 and 1800.

During World War II, two large prisoner-of-war camps were located here, with Oflag V-B for officers, and internment camp Ilag V-B for allied civilians, mainly from the Channel Islands.

Economy
With an unemployment rate of around 3.6 percent and place of business of companies like EnBW, Handtmann, Liebherr, KaVo Dental GmbH, Vollmer and Boehringer Ingelheim, Biberach is a significant industrial location in the southwest of Germany.

KaVo
KaVo (Kaltenbach & Voigt) is a company producing dental medicine equipment and products like instruments, dental systems, laboratory and equipment for training centres for universities. The head office is in Biberach. In March 2004, Danaher, an American industrial company, took over KaVo. KaVo was later acquired by Envista. The company returned to private ownership as part of the Planmeca Group in January, 2022.

Boehringer Ingelheim
Boehringer Ingelheim researches, develops and produces pharmaceuticals. Boehringer Ingelheim was founded in Ingelheim am Rhein, Germany, in 1885, where the corporate headquarters are located. There are about 4,500 employees in Biberach.

EnBW
EnBW means "Energy Baden-Württemberg". Its corporate centre is in Karlsruhe. EnBW is Germany's third largest energy company. In Biberach there are about 900 employees.

Liebherr Biberach
The beginning of Liebherr Biberach was in 1954. The firm produces many sorts of cranes. 1,700 people and 112 trainees work there. The group's founder, Dr. Hans Liebherr, invented the mobile tower crane in 1949 in Kirchdorf/Iller.

Transportation
The town has two stations on the Southern Railway (Württemberg) and hourly trains to Ulm and Friedrichshafen.

Arts and entertainment

Museums
Braith-Mali-Museum: The museum resides in a building from the 16th century and presents on 2,800 square meters archaeology, history, art and natural history. 
 Wieland-Museum: The exhibition explores the life and work of Christoph Martin Wieland. The museum was founded in 1907 and resides in the summer house of Wieland.

Film festival
Biberach has a film fest for German films which was founded in 1978.

"Biberacher Schützenfest"
The Biberacher Schützenfest is a historic festival for children and the town. The event is held annually in  July and lasts nine days. The name "Schützenfest" derives from the German noun Schütze, meaning marksman. But nowadays, the crossbow competition and the appraisal of the best male and female champion shot (Schützenkönig and -königin) are only small events during the week of the Schützenfest. Other attractions and events during the festival are: 
 Street parades
 Fairgrounds
 Historical performances
 Theme park
 Parties in bars, cafès and so on
 Beer tent
 Children's theater (Schützentheater)

Christmas Market
The annual Christmas market, called "Christkindlesmarkt", which lasts 16 days, is another highlight of the year. Exotic foods from Britain, France, and Italy (presented by the twin cities), kitsch, and beautiful arts and crafts are there to see and buy. People meet to drink mulled wine.

Music
The church music in Biberach is specially determined by the St.-Martins-Chorknaben Biberach (English: St Martin's Boys’ Choir Biberach).

Other events in Biberach
Musiknacht
 Musikfrühling
Kabarettherbst

Sports
TG Biberach 1847 e. V. is one of the biggest clubs in the region. It has more than 6,000 members and 27 divisions including American football, tennis, chess or volleyball.

IBOT Another important sports festival in Biberach is IBOT, an annual international handball tournament for youth with more than a thousand participants which takes place at Easter.

Notable people

Matthias Erzberger (1875–1921), German politician is buried in Biberach an der Riß
Alf Bayrle (1900–1982), German painter and printmaker was born in Biberach an der Riß
Anton Braith (1836–1905), German painter of animals; was born and died in Biberach an der Riß
Loris Karius (born 1993), Newcastle United F.C. goalkeeper
Dirk Raudies (born 1964), Grand Prix driver, was born in Biberach an der Riß
Harry Baer (born 1947), actor, producer, author
Johann Melchior Dinglinger (1664–1731), jeweller at the court of Augustus II the Strong in Dresden 
Steffen Deibler (born 1987), swimmer
Markus Deibler (born 1990), swimmer
Eberhard Emminger (1808–1885), lithographer 
Hugo Häring (1882–1958), architect
Justin Heinrich Knecht (1752–1817), composer, organ player, conductor
Anton Kutter (1903–1985), regisseur and telescope constructor
Johann Baptist Pflug (1785–1866), German genre painter

Twin towns – sister cities

Biberach an der Riß is twinned with:
 Asti, Italy
 Świdnica, Poland
 Telavi, Georgia
 Tendring, England, United Kingdom
 Valence, France

Biberach an der Riß also has friendly relationship with Guernsey.

See also
Museum Biberach
Gustav Gerster (company)
Pestalozzi-Gymnasium Biberach
Wieland-Gymnasium Biberach

References

External links

  
 Biberach Riss - Interactive discovery
 The "Szenefuehrer" - a guide to pubs, bars, restaurants, etc. for students in Biberach (English version pending)

 
1803 disestablishments in the Holy Roman Empire
States and territories established in 1281
Biberach (district)
1280s establishments in the Holy Roman Empire
1281 establishments in Europe
Free imperial cities
Württemberg